Carla Sue Kelly (born 1947) is an American writer in the Regency romance genre. She is the author of over forty books and short stories. Her books are what romance readers call "keepers," i.e. books they keep in their private collections, and accordingly they can be hard to find. Renowned for what she calls "dukeless" regencies, her stories often revolve around ordinary people solving their own problems. While many Regency romances feature soldiers returned from the Napoleonic Wars, several of Kelly's books include soldiers and sailors actively involved in the Peninsular campaign and in the naval blockade that prevented France from invading England, bringing this war to life in an unforgettable way. However, her regencies only reflect a part of her writing interests. She also has a strong interest in the American West, which is reflected in her earliest published works and in her non-fiction. Since 2011, Kelly, who has a Mormon background, has written four historical romance novels that focus on the lives of young Mormon women: Borrowed Light, Enduring Light, My Loving Vigil Keeping, and Safe Passage.

Biography 
Born in 1947, Carla Sue Kelly calls herself a navy brat. The daughter of a Navy Officer, she grew up overseas or on one coast of the United States or the other. She graduated from Brigham Young University in Provo, Utah where she studied Latin American history. She completed a master's degree at the University of Louisiana-Monroe, in American history, with a focus on the Civil War and Indian Wars.

In her varied professional career Kelly has worked as a ranger/historian with the National Park Service at Fort Laramie National Historic Site, and a ranger at Fort Union Trading Post National Historic Site; a contract research historian for the State Historical Society of North Dakota and history instructor at university level. Kelly is a former staff features writer for the Valley City Times Record newspaper based in Valley City, North Dakota.

Kelly lives in Idaho Falls, Idaho. She is married to Martin Kelly, former Director of Theatre at Valley City State University, in Valley City, North Dakota, who is now retired. The couple has five grown children now located in various parts of America.

Literary influences 
When interviewed by Lola Sparks in Purple Pens, Kelly identified the following writers as having influenced her:
 Louisa May Alcott
 The Hornblower novels of C. S. Forester
 R. F. Delderfield
 Joseph Conrad
 Nevil Shute
 Jack Schaefer
 Ernest Haycox
 Charles King

In her author profile on the e-Harlequin site, Kelly says her three favorite fictional works have remained constant through the years, although their rankings tend to shift: War and Peace by Leo Tolstoy, The Lawrenceville Stories by Owen Johnson, and A Town Like Alice by Nevil Shute. Her favorite historical works are One Vast Winter Count, On the Border with Mackenzie, and Crossing the Line. Her favorite crime fiction authors are Michael Connelly, John Harvey, and Peter Robinson.

Writing career 
Kelly began writing Regency Romances because of her interest in the Napoleonic Wars (1803-1815). A major theme in her books is how war touches the lives of ordinary people. In surviving the effects of war and in helping other survivors her characters find in themselves qualities of strength and purpose not previously evident. They are quiet achievers influencing the world on small, personal stages, making a difference in their own lives and others ultimately by acts of kindness rather than daring. Kelly goes against the norms of the genre by focusing her attention not on the glittering world of London society and the social elite, but on the other 99.9% of the population occupying England. Her stories are distinguished by authentic, well-researched detail and lightened by a ready sense of humour.

Kelly has also written an acclaimed series of short stories about the men, women and children of Fort Laramie during the Indian Wars era of American history. In 2003 her entire collection of Indian War stories was re-published in Here's to the Ladies: Stories from the Frontier Army. Two of these stories A Season for Heroes and Kathleen Flaherty's Long Winter were awarded Spur Awards from the Western Writers of America.

Awards 
 1978 Spur Award:Short Subject (Western Writers of America) - A Season for Heroes (FAR West Magazine)
 1981 Spur Award:Short Subject (Fiction) (Western Writers of America) - Kathleen Flaherty's Long Winter (FAR West Magazine)
 1993-1994 Romantic Times Career Achievement Award - Regency
 1995 RITA Award: Best Regency Romance (Romance Writers of America) - Mrs Drew Plays Her Hand
 1997 RITA Award: Best Regency Romance (Romance Writers of America) - The Lady's Companion
 Best Regency Romance All Time, #4
 2001 All About Romance. Readers Award: Best Regency Romance - One Good Turn.
 2001 Romance Readers Anonymous. Best Regency Romance - One Good Turn
 2001 Romance Readers Anonymous. Best Regency Author
 2002 All About Romance. Readers Award: Best Traditional Regency - The Wedding Journey.
 2001 Romance Readers Anonymous. Best Regency Romance - The Wedding Journey
 2011 Whitney Award: Best Romance of the Year - Borrowed Light
 2012 Whitney Award: Best Historical Fiction of the Year - My Loving Vigil Keeping

Additionally, in 2022, her 2011 novel Borrowed Light was placed on the AML 100 Works of Significant Mormon Literature.

Bibliography

Benedict Nesbitt series 
 Libby's London Merchant (1991)
 One Good Turn (2001)

Channel Fleet trilogy 
 Marrying the Captain (2009)
 The Surgeon's Lady (2009)
 Marrying the Royal Marine (2010)

Borrowed Light series 
 Borrowed Light (2011)
 Enduring Light (2012)

Spanish Brand series 
 Double Cross (2013)
 Marco and the Devil's Bargain (2014)
 Paloma and the Horse Traders (2015)
 The Star in the Meadow (2017)

Stand-alone novels 
 Daughter of Fortune (1985)
 Summer Campaign (1989)
 Miss Chartley's Guided Tour (1989)
 Marian's Christmas Wish (1989)
 Mrs. McVinnie's London Season (1990)
 Miss Grimsley's Oxford Career (1992)
 Miss Billings Treads the Boards (1993)
 Miss Whittier Makes a List (1994)
 Mrs. Drew Plays Her Hand (1994)
 Reforming Lord Ragsdale (1995)
 The Lady's Companion (1996)
 With This Ring (1997)
 Miss Milton Speaks Her Mind (1998)
 The Wedding Journey (2002)
 Beau Crusoe (2007)
 The Admiral's Penniless Bride (2010)
 Coming Home for Christmas (2011)
 Marriage of Mercy (2012)
 My Loving Vigil Keeping (2012)
 Her Hesitant Heart (2013)
 Safe Passage (2013)
 The Wedding Ring Quest (2014)
 Softly Falling (2014)
 Doing No Harm (2015)
 Courting Carrie in Wonderland (2017)
 The Unlikely Master Genius (2018)
 One Step Enough (2018)

Short stories 
This list excludes articles written in her capacity of journalist or feature writer for various newspapers and magazines, primarily in North Dakota.
 A Season for Heroes. FAR West Magazine, 1978
 Kathleen Flaherty's Long Winter. FAR West Magazine, 1981
 Something New in Wedding Bouquet. Signet, 1996
 Make a Joyful Noise in A Regency Christmas Carol. Signet, 1997
 The Christmas Ornament in A Regency Christmas. Signet, 1998
 An Object of Charity in A Regency Christmas Present. Signet, 1999
 The Background Man in The Grand Hotel. Signet, 2000
 The Three Kings in The Regency Christmas II. Signet, 2000
 The Buffalo Carcass on the Company Sink: Sanitation at a Frontier Army Fort. North Dakota History: Journal of the Northern Plains. Vol. 69, 2002
 The Light Within in A Regency Valentine II. Signet, 2002
 No Room at the Inn in The Regency Christmas IX. Signet, 2002
 Here's to the Ladies: Stories of the Frontier Army. Texas Christian University Press, 2003
 Let Nothing You Dismay in Regency Christmas Wishes. Signet, 2003
 'To Restore these Children': Fort Totten's Preventorium, 1935–1940. Northern Great Plains History Conference (2004: Bismarck, North Dakota)
 A Hasty Marriage in Wedding Belles. Signet, 2004
 On the Upper Missouri: The Journal of Rudolph Friedrich Kurz, 1851–1852. University of Oklahoma Press, 2005 (Editor)
 An Object of Charity in A Homespun Regency Christmas. Signet, 2008   Note: re-issue of short story published originally in A Regency Christmas Present. Signet, 1999
 "Christmas Promise" in "A Regency Christmas." Harlequin, October 2009
 Carla Kelly's Christmas Collection (Cedar Fort, Inc., from Signet reprints), October 2013
 In Love and War (Cedar Fort, Inc., from Signet reprints), November 2013
 Season's Regency Greetings: Two Christmas Novellas, November 2014
 All Regency Collection (A Timeless Romance Anthology Book 10, January 2015)
 "Christmas Eve Proposal" in It Happened One Christmas (2015)
 "Christmas Dance with the Rancher" in Western Christmas Proposals (2016)
 For This We Are Soldiers: Tales of the Frontier Army (2016)
 A Season of Love (2017)
 "Captain Grey's Christmas Proposal" in Regency Christmas Wishes (2017)

Awards 
 Spur Award – Western Writers of America, Best Short Fiction – 1978, "A Season for Heroes," published in Here's to the Ladies: Stories of the Frontier Army, 2004, Texas Christian University Press.
 Spur Award – Western Writers of America, Best Short Fiction – 1981, "Kathleen Flaherty’s Long Winter," published in Here's to the Ladies: Stories of the Frontier Army, 2004, Texas Christian University Press.
 Career Achievement Award – Romantic Times, 1994-95
 Rita Award – Romance Writers of America, Best Regency of the Year – 1995, Mrs. Drew Plays Her Hand
 Rita Award – Romance Writers of America, Best Regency of the Year – 1997, The Lady's Companion
 Whitney Award – LDStorymakers, Best Romance Fiction – 2011, Borrowed Light
 Whitney Award – LDStorymakers, Best Historical Fiction – 2012, My Loving Vigil Keeping
 Whitney Award  Finalist – LDStorymakers, Best Historical Fiction – 2013, Safe Passage

References

External links
 Website: Carla Kelly, Author
 "Carla Kelly" (author profile). EHarlequin.com e-Harlequin.com
 "Interview with Carla Kelly". Risky Regencies Blog. (4 March 2007) 
 "Interview with writer Carla Kelly". Purple Pens.com (February 2003) Purple Pens
 Regency Award Winners at Good Ton: a Resource for Readers of Regency Romance Novels

American romantic fiction writers
RITA Award winners
Brigham Young University alumni
1947 births
Living people